Ilfat Rinatovich Abdullin (born 9 January 1998) is a Kazakhstani archer. He competed in the men's individual event at the 2020 Summer Olympics. Abdullin has Tatar roots.

References

External links
 

1998 births
Living people
Kazakhstani male archers
Olympic archers of Kazakhstan
Archers at the 2020 Summer Olympics
People from Almaty Region
Kazakhstani people of Tatar descent
Tatar sportspeople
Archers at the 2018 Asian Games
21st-century Kazakhstani people